Tomasz Lisowski (born 4 April 1985 in Braniewo) is a Polish international footballer who plays as a defender.

Career

Club
In February 2011, he joined Korona Kielce. He made his debut for Korona in a 3–3 draw with Polonia Bytom.

International
He was a part of Poland national football team which played three times.

References

External links
  
  

1985 births
Living people
OKS Stomil Olsztyn players
Amica Wronki players
Górnik Łęczna players
Widzew Łódź players
Korona Kielce players
Pogoń Szczecin players
Polish footballers
Poland international footballers
People from Braniewo
Sportspeople from Warmian-Masurian Voivodeship

Association football defenders